Irving Glacier is located in the US state of Oregon. The glacier is situated in the Cascade Range at an elevation near  and is on the south slopes of Middle Sister, an extinct stratovolcano.

See also
 List of glaciers in the United States

References

Glaciers of Oregon
Glaciers of Lane County, Oregon